"Good Times" is a single by London-based grime music collective Roll Deep, which features vocals by Jodie Connor. It was released for digital download on 25 April 2010 on Relentless / Virgin Records. The MCs who make an appearance in the song are Wiley, Breeze, Brazen and Scratchy. The song was produced by Takeover Entertainment producer David Dawood and the chorus topline was written by David Dawood, Jodie Connor & Charlotte. It has been parodied by Chris Moyles and Dave Vitty as "Good Rhyme" by artist Roll Deeper.

Critical reception
Nick Levine of Digital Spy gave the song a positive review stating:

2010 has already thrown up some pretty original pop hits (Plan B's 'She Said', Ellie Goulding's 'Starry Eyed'), some pretty classy ones Kelis's 'Acapella', Alicia Keys's 'Empire State of Mind Part II', and some that, though neither of these things, pretty much do the business regardless. 'Good Times', the new tune from London grime crew Roll Deep, falls firmly into that last category.

The urban clubby production owes a debt to Calvin Harris's recent Dizzee Rascal collaborations, the lyrics mine much the same party-on vibe as [the] Black Eyed Peas' 'I Gotta Feeling', and there are even a few GaGa-style "oh-oh-oh-oh"s chucked in for good measure. Desperately derivative it may be, but it's hard to take against a single that rhymes "late-night shopping" with "high street bopping", especially one with a socking great chorus like this. .

Track listings and formats

Chart performance
"Good Times" debuted on the Irish Singles Chart on 29 April 2010 at number 42, peaking at number 13.

On 2 May 2010, "Good Times" entered the UK Singles Chart at #1. This marked Roll Deep's first Top 10 hit, and their first ever number-one single in the UK. The single remained at the top spot for three consecutive weeks, being the second act to do so that year after Owl City spent 3 weeks at the top spot in February 2010 with "Fireflies".

Personnel
Wiley - vocals
Breeze - vocals
Brazen - vocals
Scratchy - vocals
With:

Jodie Connor - vocals (chorus)

Charts

Certifications

References

External links
UK Grime Group Roll Deep Scores U.K. No. 1 by Billboard

2010 singles
Roll Deep songs
Eurodance songs
UK Singles Chart number-one singles
Songs written by Jodie Connor
Song recordings produced by David Dawood
Songs written by Wiley (musician)
2010 songs
Relentless Records singles
Number-one singles in Scotland
Songs written by Charlotte (singer)